Footsteps in the Sand may refer to:

 Footsteps in the Sand (film), 2010 Bulgarian film
 "Footprints" (poem), a poem

See also
 Footprints in the Sand (disambiguation)